The Women's Super-G in the 2023 FIS Alpine Skiing World Cup is currently scheduled to include eight events, including the final. The original schedule called for nine events, but a scheduled downhill at St. Anton on 14 January was converted to a Super-G due to the inability to hold pre-race practice runs on either of the two days prior to the event.  A later Super-G at Cortina was converted into a downhill to restore the original schedule balance, but then a downhill at Crans Montana on 25 February had to be delayed a day due to fog and dangerous course conditions, and the Super-G previously scheduled for that day was cancelled and not rescheduled.

After seven events, there had been seven different race winners from five different countries. The seventh race, in Kvitfjell, was particularly unusual because it started during a blizzard, but conditions eased for the later starters; the entire podium (all Austrians) had starting positions located after the break taken after the top skiers in the discipline had finished (the first 22 positions).

Going into the eighth race (the World Cup final), last season's Super-G runner-up, Elena Curtoni of Italy, held a narrow lead in the discipline standings, although the top five (Curtoni, Lara Gut-Behrami, Ragnhild Mowinckel, Cornelia Hütter, and defending discipline champion Federica Brignone) were separated by only 44 points. That final was won by Gut-Behrami (with Brignone second and Mowinckel third), who thus became the only two-time winner in Super-G for the season and repeated as discipline champion for the fourth time (along with 2014, 2016, and 2021).

The season was interrupted by the 2023 World Ski Championships in the linked resorts of Courchevel and Méribel, France from 6–19 February 2023. Although the Alpine Skiing branch of the International Ski Federation (FIS) conducts both the World Cup and the World Championships, the World Championships are organized by nation (a maximum of four skiers is generally permitted per nation), and (after 1970) the results count only for World Championship medals, not for World Cup points. Accordingly, the results in the World Championship are highlighted in blue and shown in this table by ordinal position only in each discipline.  The women's Super-G was held in Méribel on 8 February.

The World Cup final took place on Thursday, 16 March in Soldeu, Andorra. Only the top 25 skiers in the World Cup Super-G discipline and the winner of the Junior World Championship, plus any skiers who have scored at least 500 points in the World Cup overall classification for the season, were eligible to compete in the final, and only the top 15 earned World Cup points.  The only "500-point" skiers in the race were Ilka Štuhec of Slovenia and Petra Vlhová of Slovakia, who did not earn points.

Standings

Legend

DNF = Did Not Finish
DSQ = Disqualified

See also
 2023 Alpine Skiing World Cup – Women's summary rankings
 2023 Alpine Skiing World Cup – Women's Overall
 2023 Alpine Skiing World Cup – Women's Downhill
 2023 Alpine Skiing World Cup – Women's Giant Slalom
 2023 Alpine Skiing World Cup – Women's Slalom
 World Cup scoring system

References

External links
 Alpine Skiing at FIS website

Women's super-G
FIS Alpine Ski World Cup women's Super-G discipline titles